Nick Kellogg (born December 11, 1991) is an American professional basketball player who plays for Paris Basketball. He is the son of former National Basketball Association (NBA) player Clark Kellogg. He went to St. Francis DeSales High School in Columbus, Ohio where he played basketball and competed in consecutive state Final Fours. He played collegiate basketball for Ohio University.

College career

Recruitment

Overview
Kellogg was a four-year starter for the Ohio Bobcats men's basketball team, helping the Bobcats win the MAC tournament in 2012. In the 2013–14 season, he set the school record for career 3 point shots made (previously held by former teammate D. J. Cooper) in his final regular season game as a Bobcat versus Miami (OH). Kellogg later broke the same record for the Mid-American Conference (MAC) in the first round MAC tournament win over Ball State. During his career at Ohio, Kellogg participated in the NCAA tournament (2012) ending in the "Sweet Sixteen",  NIT (2013), and the CIT (2011 and 2014).

Kellogg played in the 2014 Portsmouth Invitational Tournament. He was 1 of 64 seniors in the NCAA invited to participate.

Statistics

All statistics are from espn.com

Professional career
On October 30, 2016, Kellogg was acquired by the Windy City Bulls, but was waived on November 4.

References

External links
Polish Basketball League profile

1991 births
Living people
American expatriate basketball people in France
American expatriate basketball people in Georgia (country)
American expatriate basketball people in Poland
American men's basketball players
Basketball players from Columbus, Ohio
Ohio Bobcats men's basketball players
Paris Basketball players
People from Westerville, Ohio
Start Lublin players
Guards (basketball)